David Honey may be:

 David Honey (politician), Australian politician
 , American politician
 Dave Honey, professional darts player